The Parti indépendantiste fielded twelve candidates in the 1989 Quebec provincial election, none of whom were elected.

Candidates

Rosemont: Richard Belleau
Richard Belleau received 278 votes (1.00%), finishing fifth against Liberal incumbent Guy Rivard.

References

Candidates in Quebec provincial elections
1989